Timothy S. "Tim" Lanane is a Democratic member of the Indiana Senate, representing the 25th District since 1997, succeeding William McCarthy. Following the retirement of Senator Vi Simpson, Lanane became Minority Leader in 2013. District 25 includes the cities of Muncie and Anderson as well as Union Township and part of Anderson Township in Madison County and Salem, Center, Monroe, Liberty and Perry townships in Delaware County.

References

External links
 State Senator Tim Lanane official Indiana State Legislature site
 Tim Lanane official campaign site

 

1952 births
21st-century American politicians
Democratic Party Indiana state senators
Living people